Thomas Student (28 October 1897 – 11 February 1976) was a German footballer. In 1916, he became the first team captain of Schalke 04, then called Westfalia Schalke. He held the captaincy until 1928.

In 2008, Schalke named him posthumously as an honorary captain of the club.

References

1897 births
1976 deaths
Association football defenders
German footballers
FC Schalke 04 players